WAYV (95.1 MHz) is a commercial FM radio station located in Atlantic City, New Jersey. It airs a contemporary hit radio format. It has been among the top rated and billing stations in the Atlantic City market since 1980. Its studios are located at the Bayport One complex in West Atlantic City, and its transmitter is located north of Atlantic City. The on-air personalities are Mike & Diane (mornings), Nikki (middays), Kaden (afternoons), and Jackson Blue (weeknights). WAYV is simulcast on 102.3 WAIV in Cape May.

History
95.1 started broadcasting in April 1961, with call letters WRNJ.  Mel Gollub, owner of WIFI (now WXTU) in Philadelphia, built WRNJ on top of the Ritz Carlton Hotel on the Boardwalk in Atlantic City.  He owned and operated it for its first two years.

In 1963, Gollub sold WRNJ to Eddie Newman, a nighttime talk host at WPEN, Philadelphia.

On July 1, 1974, Newman sold the station to Radio WAYV, Inc., and its call letters were changed to WAYV. The station featured a "Beautiful Music" format that lasted until 1977.  The music was provided by Jim Schulke's Stereo Radio Productions.

In 1978, under Program Director Bob Everland, the format evolved into "The Music People", a soft-rock format similar to "Magic" stations, such as WMGK in Philadelphia.

In January 1979, with the arrival of Kingsley Smith as Program Director, the format was made more contemporary and disco was added at night. The response to "Disco nights at the Jersey shore" was large enough so that in late 1979 WAYV became the "Rhythm of South Jersey" with full-time disco, and had its first time as #1 in the Spring 1980 Atlantic City Arbitron.

With the wane of disco in 1981, the format again evolved into Hot Adult Contemporary (Hot AC) daytime / Contemporary Hit Radio (CHR) nighttime, with the arrival of John Barab as Program Director.  That combination remained into the early '90s through a number of program directors.  In April 1990, WAYV started calling itself "Hot 95", which lasted for a short period of time.  With some updates and adjustments over the last twenty years, the Hot AC format still existed until 2011. Despite the disco and Hot AC formats, WAYV also provided the first Atlantic City broadcast home for Jerry Blavat and his live broadcasts from Memories in Margate.

During the 1980s, WAYV's studios were located on the Atlantic City boardwalk at Chelsea Ave., and before that, the broadcast studio was located on the rooftop of the Ritz Apartments (formerly the Ritz Carlton Hotel). From 1980 through 1981 the business office was located in a rowhouse on the beach block of California Avenue. The General Manager at this time was Vi Trofa, a former school administrator who was hired by Radio WAYV, Inc.'s then-owners Bob McMurtrie, Carl Monk, and Tom Donatucci to run the business operation. Trofa was married to the former mayor of Ocean City, Nick Trofa, and would remain as General Manager through 1993. Throughout the mid-to-late 1980s, WAYV is an affiliate of The Rockin' America Top 30 Countdown with Scott Shannon.

In 1986, Radio WAYV Inc. was purchased by Robert Forrest. In 1991, WAYV moved from its Boardwalk location to its present studio site at the Bayport One building in West Atlantic City. In the fall of 1993, Atlantic City Broadcasting Corp., a subsidiary of Frank Osborn's Osborn Communications, began operating WAYV and purchased it in March 1994.

In June 1996, WAYV was purchased by Equity Communications. It remains in the Bayport One building, and has been joined by Equity's other acquisitions, which include 100.7 WZXL, 99.3 Kiss FM, 96.1 WTTH "The Touch" and Classic Oldies WMID 1340 and Easy 93.1. In 2003, WAYV began simulcasting on 102.3 WAIV, giving the station better coverage in the southern portion of the market as well as some penetration into Lewes, Delaware and coastal Sussex County.

By July 4, 2011, following their flashback weekend, the station changed to contemporary hit radio with Mediabase & Nielsen BDS moving the station to that panel later on.

Previous logos

Logo used when simulcasting its programming on the 102.3 frequency.

See also
 WAIV

External links

AYV
Contemporary hit radio stations in the United States
Radio stations established in 1961
1961 establishments in New Jersey